Los Andes Province is one of eight provinces of the central Chilean region of Valparaíso (V). The city of Los Andes is the capital of the province.

Administration
As a province, Los Andes is a second-level administrative division, governed by a provincial delegate who is appointed by the president. Edith Quiroz Ortiz, appointed by president Piñera on April 22, 2010, was the first woman to hold the office of Governor of Los Andes. The presidential provincial delegate appointed by president Gabriel Boric is Cristian Aravena Reyes, a Socialist.

Communes
The province is composed of four communes (Spanish: comunas), each governed by a municipality consisting of an alcalde and municipal council:
Calle Larga
Los Andes
San Esteban
Rinconada

Geography and demography
According to the 2002 census, Los Andes is the sixth most populous province in the region with a population of 91,683. At that time, there were 74,104 people living in urban areas, 17,579 people living in rural areas, 46,325 men and 45,358 women.

References

External links
 Delegation of Los Andes

Provinces of Chile
Provinces of Valparaíso Region